Fei Qinyuan (born March 20, 2001 in Shanghai, China) is a Chinese idol singer. She is a member of Team HII of Chinese idol group SNH48, as well as its sub-unit, Color Girls.

Early life
Fei started learning archery and designing from a young age. She studied at Shanghai Dajing Junior High School Affiliated to SISU , during then she started learning to play the ukulele.

Career
On 25 July 2015, during SNH48's second General Election, Fei Qinyuan was announced as one of the fifth-generation members of SNH48. On 4 December, she made her first public performance during Team XII's first stage, "Theater no Megami", performing "Locker Room Boy" as a center member.

Since 10 January, Fei has starred in National Girl, and was made champion, however she pulled out on 17 March due to scheduling conflicts. On 5 April, she made her film debut by starring in Out of Control together with T.O.P and Cecilia Cheung, which is expected to be released in December 2016. On 30 July, during SNH48's third General Election, Fei was ranked 22nd with 20,137.9 votes.

On July 29, 2017, during SNH48's fourth General Election, Fei came in 40th with 20614.0 votes.

On February 3, 2018, during SNH48's fourth Request Time, Fei was transferred to Team HII following the disbandment of Team XII as part of the SNH48 Team Shuffle.

Public image
On 28 January 2016, Fei was referred by Japanese media as a "beauty in 4000 years", a title that was previously given to Ju Jingyi. Many fans then also compared her to early-era Mayu Watanabe, due to her wearing Watanabe's signature "twin-tail" hairstyle.

Discography

With SNH48

EPs

With Color Girls
 美少女时代 (2016)

Units

SNH48 Stage Units

Concert units

Filmography

Films

Dramas

Variety shows

References

External links
 Official Member Profile 
 
 
 Fei Qinyuan on douban 
 Fei Qinyuan on Mtime 
 
 Fei Qinyuan on bilibili 
 Fei Qinyuan on TikTok 

2001 births
Living people
SNH48 members
Actresses from Shanghai
Chinese child singers
Chinese Mandopop singers
Chinese film actresses
Chinese television actresses
21st-century Chinese actresses
Singers from Shanghai
Youth With You contestants